David Kopf is professor emeritus at the University of Minnesota. A research scholar on South Asian history, he has produced several books on the region. He has won the Guggenheim Fellowship at the University.

References

University of Minnesota faculty
Living people
University of Chicago alumni
21st-century American historians
21st-century American male writers
Year of birth missing (living people)
Historians from Minnesota
American male non-fiction writers